Ron Wieck (born August 13, 1944) is a former Iowa state senator from the 27th District.  A Republican, he served as Senate minority leader, assuming the post following former minority leader Mary Lundby's announcement of plans to retire from the Senate in 2008. He served in the Iowa Senate from 2003 to 2010.

Wieck served on several committees in the Iowa Senate - the Economic Growth committee; the Government Oversight committee; the Labor and Business Relations committee; the State Government committee; the Veterans Affairs committee; and the Commerce committee, where he is the ranking member.

Wieck was re-elected in 2006 with 13,459 votes, running unopposed.

External links
Senator Ron Wieck official Iowa Legislature site
Senator Ron Wieck official Iowa General Assembly site
Senator Ron Wieck at Iowa Senate Republican Caucus
 

Republican Party Iowa state senators
1944 births
Living people
People from Plymouth County, Iowa
Politicians from Sioux City, Iowa